The 2012 Telkom Knockout is a football (soccer) knockout competition which comprised the 16 teams in the South African Premier Soccer League. It was the 21st tournament, and the 7th under the Telkom Knockout name. The tournament is effectively South Africa's league cup, as entry is open only to clubs in the top league. The cup is usually played in the first half of the season. The tournament began on 17 October and ended on 1 December 2012.

In all matches there has to be a winner on the day, this will be decided if there is a winner after full-time (90 minutes). If teams are tied at full-time then extra time will be played, penalties will decide the winner if the scores are still even (there is no golden goal rule).

Teams
The 16 teams that competed in the Telkom Knockout competition are: (listed in alphabetical order).

 1. Ajax Cape Town
 2. AmaZulu
 3. Bidvest Wits
 4. Black Leopards
 5. Bloemfontein Celtic
 6. Chippa United
 7. Free State Stars
 8. Golden Arrows

 9. Kaizer Chiefs
 10. Mamelodi Sundowns
 11. Maritzburg United
 12. Moroka Swallows
 13. Orlando Pirates
 14. Platinum Stars
 15. Supersport United
 16. University of Pretoria

Prize money

The Telkom Knockout is the highest paying cup competition in Africa with a grand total prize money of R 14,200,000.
 Each team taking part in the Telkom Knockout will receive a participation fee of R 250,000.

First-round losers

 Prize money: R 200,000
 Participation fee: R 250,000
Total: R 450f000 for 8 teams each

Losing quarterfinalists

 Prize money: R 400,000
 Participation fee: R 250,000
Total: R 650,000 for 4 teams each

Losing Semi-Finalists

 Prize money: R 750,000
 Participation fee: R 250,000
Total: R 1,000,000 for 2 teams each

Final  –  runner up

 Prize money: R 1,500,000
 Participation fee: R 250,000
Total: R 1,750,000

Final  –  winner

 Prize money: R 4,000,000
 Participation fee: R 250,000
Total: R 4,250,000

‘'Total prize money'’

 Total prize money: R 10,200,000
 Total participation fee: R 4,000,000
Grand total: R 14,200,000

Results

Bracket

First round
The draw for the first round was done on 9 October 2012.  The first round matches took place from 19–23 October.

Quarter-finals
The draw for the quarterfinal was done at Loftus Stadium in Pretoria on Tuesday 23 October 2012. 
The quarter-finals took place on 2, 3 and 4 November 2012.

Semi-finals
The draw for the Semi-Finals took place on Monday 5 November 2012.  The semi-finals took take place on 17 and 18 November 2012.

Final

See also
Telkom Knockout
South African Football Association

References

External links
Telkom Knockout Cup Official Website
Telkom Official Website
Premier Soccer League
South African Football Association
Confederation of African Football

Telkom Knockout